Saltpond is a town and the capital of the Mfantsiman Municipal District in the Central Region of South Ghana. Saltpond has a population of 24,689 people.

Economy

History
Saltpond was in a state of economic decline since the landing beach was abandoned for the Tema and Takoradi harbours in the 1960s. Another factor was the building of a bypass on the N1:Aflao-Elubo Highway around the same time which meant that transit traffic through the town virtually ceased.  Most of its factories collapsed. The Saltpond Ceramic factory, Coil Factory and the UAC (now Unilever) soft drink factory held on into the early 1990s but then failed too. The economy has resurged since the town recently grew to meet the bypass.

Petroleum
Saltpond is noted for offshore crude oil resources. Saltpond Offshore Producing Company Limited, and two joint venture partners operate the Saltpond Oil Field.

Non-Petroleum
The town is a major market centre in the Mfantsiman Municipality. Fish and other foodstuffs are traded in the market. It also has several shops. The Ghana Commercial Bank has a branch in the town.

The Palm Beach hotel is located atop a hill in town. Schools are a major source of employment, and the Mfantsiman Girl's Senior High School is the biggest single employer. The Saltpond Ceramic Factory has been bought by a Chinese firm, which is attempting to revive it and has now employed countless number of Youths in the town. Fishing takes place mainly in the Nankesido a suburb of Saltpond. Maize farming is prominent as well as bee-keeping. The government also has a District Hospital in Saltpond, Geological Survey Department, Meteorological Department, The District Police Office and Ghana Education Resource Centre. The Municipal Authority is also a major source of employment in the town.

Climate
Saltpond has a relatively dry tropical savanna climate (Köppen Aw) with two rainy seasons: a heavier one from March to July and a secondary wetter period in October and November. Despite the modest rainfall, humidity is high, notably in the shorter dry season centred upon August and September when the cold Benguela Current extends into the Northern Hemisphere.

Education

University
The International Ahmadiyya University Of Theology, is located in Mankessim.

Pre-University
Saltpond has the Mfantsiman Girls' Senior High School and Saltpond Methodist Senior High School. The two institutions offer the West African Examinations Council's Senior High School Certificate Examination. Mfantsiman Girls' also has a Primary and Junior High School, which are unisex. The District Authority is in charge of all these schools but they have varying degrees of autonomy. The Anglican Church and some other churches including the Roman Catholic and Methodist all have Basic Schools, which offer both Primary and Junior High Education.

Notable Natives

Organizations
Official website - The Saltpond Forum
Concern Mission Foundation

References

Links and resources

Populated places in the Central Region (Ghana)